Mohadevpur is an Upazila of Naogaon in the Division of Rajshahi, Bangladesh.

Geography

It has 76,089 households and total area 397.67 km2 and it is bounded by Patnitala on the north, Manda and Naogaon Sadar upazilas on the south, Badalgachhi and Naogaon Sadar upazilas on the east and Niamatpur and Porsha upazilas on the west. Main river is Atrai.

Mahadevpur Upazila consists of 3,06 mouzas. The area of the town is 40.46 km2.

Demographics
As of the 2011 Bangladesh census, Mohadevpur Upazila has a population of 2,92,589. Males constitute 51.06%(1,46,905) of the population, and females 48.94%(1,45,954). 18 Years above population is 1,98,322. Mohadevpur Upazila has an average literacy rate of 49.8% (7+ years).

According to 2011 Bangladesh census, in Mohadevpur, Muslims formed 79.62% of the population, Hindus 17.95%, Christians 0.14% and others 2.28%.

Art and culture
Cultural organizations: Public libraries 1, rural clubs 15, theatre group 1, cinema halls 3, woman's associations 1, jatra party 1, women welfare associations 1 and playground 30.

Public library
The only public library of Mohadevpur is situated adjacent to the Upazila Parishad office.

Economy
Main occupations: Agriculture 52.24%, agricultural labourer 29.99%, commerce 7.26%, wage labourer 1.49%, service 2.2%, others 6.82%. 

Land use: Agricultural land 30386 hectares; fallow land 375 hectares. Single crop 25%, double crop 41% and treble crop land 34%. Land under irrigation 83%.

Land control: Among the peasants 20% are rich, 24% medium, 30% marginal, 26% landless.

Value of land: Market value of land of first grade is Tk 6,000 per 0.01 hectare.

Tour organization: The only notable tour organization in the upazila is We are fearless.

 Mohadevpur Central Shaheed Minar

 Zila Parishad Dak Banglow
 Mohadevpur Rajbari

Administration
Mahadevpur upazila, primarily established as a Thana in 1898, was turned into upazila on 15 December 1983.

Mahadevpur Upazila is divided into ten union parishads: Bhimpur, Chandas, Cheragpur, Enayetpur, Hatur, Khajur, Mahadevpur, Roygon, Sofapur, and Uttargram. The union parishads are subdivided into 307 mauzas and 301 villages.

Government
The name of administrative officers;
UNO:Abu hasan

Upazila Chairman: Ahsan habib Vodon
 The name of union Chairmen
1.sayed hasan
(Chairman,Mohadevpur UP)

2.enamul haque
(Chairman,Hatur UP)

3.belal uddin
(Chairman,Khajur UP)

4.ripon mondol
(Chairman,Chandash UP)

5.arifur rahman sardar
(Chairman,Raigaon UP)

6.mehedi hasan mia
(Chairman,Enayetpur UP)

7.Md. Samsul Alam(Bachu)
(Chairman,Sofapur UP)

8. Hasan mondol
(Chairman,Uttargram UP)

9.Sibnath misra
(chairman,Charagpur UP)

10.Ram Prosad Vaddra
(Chairman,Vimpur UP)

Literacy
Literacy rate and educational institutions Average literacy 27.4%; male 35.4% and female 19.8%. Educational institutions: college 5, high school 39, government primary school 84, non-government high school 41, madrasa 21, qawmi madrasa 20.

Education
Major educational institutes include:

Colleges

Secondary schools

Madrasas

Health Department

Upazila Health & Family Planning  Officer:
Dr. Aktharuzzaman Alal

Other Doctors:

1. Dr. Anowarul Islam (Mithu), Eye Consultant 
2. Dr. Suvasish Das (Sumon), Assistant Professor, BSMMU 
3. Dr. Bibekanondo Ghosh (Opu)
4. Dr. Ranjon Chowdhury
5. Dr. Rakibul Hasan
6. Dr. Prottus Kumar Mondal
7. Dr. Debashis biswas

Mahadevpur Zamindari 
Mahadevpur Zamindari was established during the time of Mughal emperor Jahangir (1605-1627). Nayanchandra Rai Chowdhury was the founder of the zamindari. His early habitation was in Bardhaman, West Bengal. Nayanchandra Raichowdhury or his successor Bireshwar Raichowdhury believed to have received the Jagir of pargana Jahangirabad from emperor Jahangir as a reward for assisting the Mughals to invade Bangla. Later this jagir turned as an immense zamindari and it was renamed as Jahangirpur after the name of the emperor.

Bireshwar Raichowdhury was noted as a good administrator. For the welfare of the people, he constructed temples and excavated ponds in his zamindari vicinity. After the death of Bireshwar Raichowdhury, his estate was divided between his four sons and a cousin brother named Laxmikanta Raichowdhury. After the death of Laxmikanta, his son Brajanath Raichowdhury succeeded him. In his lifetime Brajanath divided his estate equally between his two sons, Durganath Raichowdhury and Govindanath Raichowdhury. Govindanath was an influential, kind-hearted and learned zamindar. After his death his son Shaymanath Raichowdhury succeeded him as the next zamindar of Mahadevpur.'

Shaymanath Raichowdhury was a philanthropist zamindar. He established a school and a hospital in Mahadevpur and contributed financial aid regularly for the maintenance of those institutions. He contributed a huge amount of money for establishing a printing press in Dinajpur city and during the famine of 1874, he donated more than 15000 taka for the relief committees of Bengal. Besides, Shaymanath bequeathed lands for the construction of roads, spent huge amount of money for establishing new schools and for arranging wedding ceremony of the poor Brahmins youths of Bengal.

Shaymanath Raichowdhury died at 24 in 1878. The successors of Mahadevpur were Khitishchandra Raichowdhury of Barataraf and Raibahadur Narayanchandra Raichowdhury of Chhotataraf. Narayanchandra Raichowdhury was noted as a scholar and a philanthropist zamindar. He established Mata Sharbamongoladevi High School at Mahadevpur in 1921. The zamindari was abolished under the East Bengal state acquisition and tenancy act of 1950. Jahangirpur College was established in 1967 within the Mahadevpur palace, which happened to be now a government College.

Technology
In Mohadevpur upazila some Private & Govt. Organization give computer & Information Technology support.

See also
Upazilas of Bangladesh
Districts of Bangladesh
Divisions of Bangladesh

References

Upazilas of Naogaon District